Cyrtodactylus gordongekkoi is a species of gecko, a lizard in the family Gekkonidae. The species is endemic to Lombok in Indonesia.

Etymology
The specific name, gordongekkoi, jokingly refers to Gordon Gekko, a character in the film Wall Street.

Habitat
The preferred natural habitat of C. gordongekkoi is forest.

Reproduction
C. gordongekkoi is oviparous.

References

Further reading
Biswas S (2007). "Assignment of currently misplaced Cnemaspis gordongekkoi Das, 1993 (Reptilia: Gekkonidae) to Cyrtodactylus Gray, 1827". Russian Journal of Herpetology 14 (1): 15–20. (Cyrtodactylus gordongekkoi, new combination).
Das I (1994). "Cnemaspis gordongekkoi, a new gecko from Lombok, Indonesia, and the biogeography of oriental species of Cnemaspis (Squamata: Sauria: Gekkonidae)". Hamadryad 18: 1–9. (Cnemaspis gordongekkoi, new species).
Rösler H (2000). "Kommentierte Liste der rezent, subrezent und fossil bekannten Geckotaxa (Reptilia: Gekkonomorpha)". Gekkota 2: 28–153. (Cnemaspis gordongekkoi, p. 62). (in German).

Cyrtodactylus
Reptiles of Indonesia
Endemic fauna of Indonesia
Reptiles described in 1994
Taxa named by Indraneil Das